The Capital Region Junior Hockey League (CRJHL) is a junior B ice hockey league in the province of Manitoba, Canada. The league, sanctioned by Hockey Manitoba, began play for 2018–19 season.

History
The CRJHL was formed in 2018 when five teams from the Keystone Junior Hockey League (KJHL) withdrew to form a new league. These five clubs, all located within an hour-and-a-half drive of Winnipeg, cited the long travel distance to northern Manitoba, where the KJHL's other six teams are located, as the main reason for leaving to create the new league.

Selkirk Fishermen defeated the North Winnipeg Satelites in six games to capture the first-ever CRJHL championship in 2019. The Fishermen, who defeated Arborg in five games were set to defend that title in 2020 against the St. Malo Warriors (swept Lundar in the semifinals), but the finals were cancelled due to COVID-19.

Season three began in October 2020 with games played with spectator limits before provincial-wide restrictions forced the cancellation of the remainder of the season.

Teams

Champions

References

External links
CRJHL website

Hockey Manitoba
Ice hockey leagues in Manitoba
B
Sports leagues established in 2018
2018 establishments in Canada